Hindistani is an Arabic-language comedy series telecast on OSN YaHala! during Ramadan. The series chronicles the efforts of a hapless Saudi Arabian youth to woo and marry a beautiful Indian woman, while also holding down a steady job. The series is inspired by Bollywood and much of it is shot in India.

Characters
Suiedan (Bashir Al Ganem)
Asad (Asad Zahrani)
Hind (Malayeen)
Suiedan's father
Obeid, Suiedan's brother
Fawaz, Suiedan's cousin
Samira
Ghanem, the merchant
Badr

Awards
2012 Best Series Digital Studio Award
2012 Best Concept Digital Studio Award

References

2010s Saudi Arabian television series
2011 television series debuts
Arabic-language television shows
Saudi Arabian comedy television series